= CineBeam Q =

CineBeam Qube (model HU710PB) is a short laser throw 4K projector product of LG. It runs on webOS 6.0, it is weighing 1 kg and its size is 31 cm that can project images up to 120 inches with 450000:1 ratio, it also has image-mapping ability as well as streaming apps. The projector supports HDR 10 color brightness. It has a USB 3 and HDMI in/out ports.
